HMS Scourge was an S-class destroyer built for the Royal Navy during the Second World War. The ship was sold to the Netherlands postwar, where it saw action in the Korean War and the West New Guinea dispute.

Description
She was powered by two Parsons geared steam turbines, each driving one propeller shaft, using steam provided by two Admiralty three-drum boilers. Her complement was 170 officers and ratings.

The ship was armed with four 45-calibre 4.7-inch (120 mm) Mark XII guns in dual-purpose mounts. For anti-aircraft (AA) defence, Scourge had one twin mount for Bofors 40 mm guns and four twin  Oerlikon autocannon. She was fitted with two above-water quadruple mounts for  torpedoes. Two depth charge rails and four throwers were fitted for which 70 depth charges were provided.

Construction and career
HMS Scourge was built by Cammell Laird, Birkenhead and launched on 8 December 1942. She was at sea during the Battle of North Cape in 1943, escorting the Russia-bound Arctic convoy JW 55B. She took no part in the fighting.

Postwar

She was sold to the Royal Netherlands Navy on 1 February 1946 and was renamed HNLMS Evertsen (D802). During the Korean War she was part of the diverse Task Force 96 in the US Seventh Fleet, and saw service during the Battle of Pusan Perimeter. She was converted to a fast frigate in 1957.

She was deployed during the period of tension between the Netherlands and Indonesia over the fate of New Guinea, and saw action during the Battle of Arafura Sea, sinking the Indonesian Jaguar-class torpedo boat Matjan Tutul, commanded by Yos Sudarso.

She was scrapped at Hendrik-Ido-Ambacht from July 1963.

References

Bibliography
 
 
 
 
 
 

 

S and T-class destroyers
Ships built on the River Mersey
1942 ships
World War II destroyers of the United Kingdom
S-class destroyers of the Royal Netherlands Navy